Mesocnemis tisi is a species of white-legged damselfly in the family Platycnemididae.

The IUCN conservation status of Mesocnemis tisi is "EN", endangered. The species faces a high risk of extinction in the near future. The IUCN status was reviewed in 2010.

References

Further reading

 

Platycnemididae
Articles created by Qbugbot
Insects described in 1992